Mačiuliškės is a village in the Vilnius District Municipality,  from Lavoriškės.

It is the birthplace of Belarusian linguist Branislaw Tarashkyevich.

References 
 Lietuvos TSR administracinio-teritorinio suskirstymo žinynas, T. 2. – Vilnius: Mintis, 1976.

Villages in Vilnius County
Vilensky Uyezd
Wilno Voivodeship (1926–1939)